Mechack Jérôme (born April 21, 1990) is a Haitian professional footballer who plays for Indy Eleven in the USL Championship.

Club career
Jérôme played for Baltimore in the Ligue Haïtienne, and then for Mirandela in the Portuguese Second Division, before being spotted by Austin Aztex head coach Adrian Heath while playing for the Haiti national team in a friendly match against the Aztex on April 28, 2010.

Jérôme signed for the Aztex in June 2010 and made his debut for the team on September 11, 2010 in a 3–1 loss to the Puerto Rico Islanders. Prior to the 2011 season, new owners purchased the club, moved it to Orlando, Florida, renamed it Orlando City and joined the USL Pro league for 2011.

He signed a multi-year contract with Orlando City on September 1, 2011.

Jérôme was signed by Sporting Kansas City of Major League Soccer on February 28, 2013. The club released him on March 31, 2014.

On June 6, 2014 he signed with Montreal Impact. He was released three weeks later.

Jérôme signed with Charlotte Independence of United Soccer League on May 1, 2015. He then signed with Jacksonville Armada FC of the North American Soccer League in September 2015. Two months later he re-signed with Jacksonville for the 2016 season.

Jérôme signed with USL Championship expansion club El Paso Locomotive on January 21, 2019. El Paso re-signed Jérôme for the 2020 season on November 21.

In December 2021, it was announced Jérôme would make the move to Indy Eleven ahead of the 2022 season.

International career
Jerome played for Haiti at the 2007 CONCACAF U17 Tournament and the 2007 FIFA U-17 World Cup, before making his debut for the full senior Haiti national team in 2008. He was part of the Haiti squad which competed in the 2008 Caribbean Championship, and helped his country qualify for the 2009 CONCACAF Gold Cup.

Career statistics
Scores and results list Haiti's goal tally first, score column indicates score after each Jérôme goal.

Honours
Baltimore SC
Ligue Haïtienne: 2007

Orlando City
USL Pro: 2011

Sporting Kansas City
MLS Cup: 2013

References

External links
 
 

1990 births
Living people
Haitian footballers
Association football defenders
Haiti international footballers
Footballers at the 2007 Pan American Games
2013 CONCACAF Gold Cup players
2014 Caribbean Cup players
2015 CONCACAF Gold Cup players
2019 CONCACAF Gold Cup players
Copa América Centenario players
Pan American Games competitors for Haiti
USSF Division 2 Professional League players
USL Championship players
Major League Soccer players
North American Soccer League players
Baltimore SC players
SC Mirandela players
Austin Aztex FC players
Orlando City SC (2010–2014) players
Sporting Kansas City players
CF Montréal players
Charlotte Independence players
Jacksonville Armada FC players
El Paso Locomotive FC players
Indy Eleven players
Haitian expatriate footballers
Haitian expatriate sportspeople in Portugal
Expatriate footballers in Portugal
Haitian expatriate sportspeople in the United States
Expatriate soccer players in the United States
Haitian expatriate sportspeople in Canada
Expatriate soccer players in Canada